Miss USA 1983 was the 32nd Miss USA pageant, televised live from the Knoxville Civic Center in Knoxville, Tennessee, on May 12, 1983.  At the conclusion of the final competition, Julie Hayek of California was crowned Miss USA 1983 by outgoing titleholder Terri Utley of Arkansas. Hayek was the first runner up at Miss Universe 1983.

The pageant was hosted by Bob Barker, with color commentary from Joan Van Ark.  It was held in Tennessee for the only time, while Miss Teen USA 1984 did the same thing in Memphis on the other side of the state.

Results

Placements

Special awards
Miss Congeniality: Dana Ruth Mintzer ( Iowa)
Miss Photogenic: Lisa Allred ( Texas)
Best State Costume: Julie Page ( Pennsylvania)

Final competition scores

 Winner 
 First runner-up
 Second runner-up 
 Third runner-up
 Fourth runner-up
 Top 12 semifinalist

Historical significance 
 California wins competition for the fourth time.
 Texas earns the 1st runner-up position for the fifth time and repeats the same position as the past year 1982. 
 South Carolina earns the 2nd runner-up position for the second time. The last time it placed this was in 1969.
 Louisiana earns the 3rd runner-up position for the second time. The last time it placed this was in 1968.
 North Dakota earns the 4th runner-up position for the first time.
 States that placed in semifinals the previous year were Michigan and Texas.
 Texas placed for the ninth consecutive year.
 Michigan made its second consecutive placement.
 California, Georgia and Louisiana last placed in 1981.
 New York and South Carolina last placed in 1980.
 Washington last placed in 1979.
 Oklahoma and Pennsylvania last placed in 1978.
 Nevada last placed in 1977.
 North Dakota last placed in 1966.
 Hawaii, Ohio, Tennessee and Virginia break an ongoing streak of placements since 1981.
 Maryland breaks an ongoing streak of placements since 1980.

Delegates

The Miss USA 1983 delegates were:

 Alabama – Teri Lane
 Alaska – Amy Harms
 Arizona – Sindy Hedden
 Arkansas – Debra Baltz
 California – Julie Hayek
 Colorado – Lisa Gay Trujillo
 Connecticut – Mary Lynn Seleman
 Delaware – Shelley Perkins
 District of Columbia – Julie Warner
 Florida – Janet Chesser
 Georgia – Dotsy Timm
 Hawaii – Zoe Roach
 Idaho – Kerry Damiano
 Illinois – Vanessa Romine
 Indiana – Toni Yudt
 Iowa – Dana Ruth Mintzer
 Kansas – Renee Ruch
 Kentucky – Lee Ann Austin
 Louisiana – Pamela Jo Forrest
 Maine – Rosemarie Hemond
 Maryland – Shawn Keller
 Massachusetts – Robin Silva
 Michigan – Kimberly Mexicotte
 Minnesota – Carolyn Mattson
 Mississippi – Becky Case (Miss United Teenager 1979)
 Missouri – Robin Riley
 Montana – Barbara Bowman
 Nebraska – Penelope Boynton    
 Nevada – Christa Daniel
 New Hampshire – Lynn Stockwell
 New Jersey – Ann Marie Brucato
 New Mexico – Kristin Larsen
 New York – Jennifer Mikelinich
 North Carolina – Allison Pinson
 North Dakota – Elizabeth Jaeger
 Ohio – Gina Gangale
 Oklahoma – Mignon Merchant
 Oregon – Shelly Kiser
 Pennsylvania – Julie Page
 Rhode Island – Allegra Hendricks
 South Carolina – Allison Grisso
 South Dakota – Kelly Rosenbaum
 Tennessee – Ladonna Jean Friday
 Texas – Lisa Allred
 Utah – Launa Lewis
 Vermont – Leslie Lucchina
 Virginia – Tanquil Collins
 Washington – Kathi Tucker
 West Virginia – Jill Rigsby
 Wisconsin – Susan Peters
 Wyoming – Joanie Engstrom

Contestant notes
Dana Ruth Mintzer (Iowa), won Miss Congeniality at both the state and national competition, 1983
Lisa Allred (Texas), 1st runner-up, went on to compete in Miss World 1983
Four contestants went on to compete in the Miss America pageant:
Elizabeth Jaegar (North Dakota) – Miss North Dakota 1985
Mignon Merchant (Oklahoma) – Miss Oklahoma 1986
Robin Riley (Missouri) – Miss Missouri 1987 (top 10 at Miss America 1988)
Joanne Stanulonis Justina (Connecticut) – Miss Connecticut 1983 (last 10 at Miss America 1984)

Judges
Monique Van Vooren
John Goodis
Kim Seelbrede, Miss USA 1981 from Ohio
Ed Marinaro
Maxine Messinger
Kevin Conway
Barbara Peterson, Miss USA 1976 from Minnesota
Vince Ferragamo
Joanie Gregons
Harry Blackstone Jr.
Chico Hamilton

References

External links
Official website

1983
1983 in Tennessee
1983 beauty pageants
1983
May 1983 events in the United States